These are the official results of the men's decathlon competition at the 1984 Summer Olympics in Los Angeles, California. There were a total number of 26 participating athletes, with the competition starting on August 8, 1984, and ending on August 9, 1984.

Medalists

Abbreviations

Schedule

August 8, 1984

August 9, 1984

Records
Earlier in 1984 the IAAF had updated its decathlon scoring tables; the tables set in 1962 (with effect from 1964) would be replaced on 1 April 1985. The world record performance at the changeover date would be recalculated using the new tables and become the new world record. In the event that another performance had a lower total on the 1962 tables but a higher one on the 1984 tables, it would not supersede the pre-existing record.

These were the standing world and Olympic records (in points) prior to the 1984 Summer Olympics:

Daley Thompson's time in the Olympic 110mH was initially recorded as 14.34, on which basis he started the final 1500m needing 4:34.8 to beat Hingsen's world record, or 4:34.9 to equal it. After slowing at the end to enjoy his triumph, he finished in 4:35.0, giving a points total of 8797, one below the world record (still a new Olympic record). The time was over 14 seconds outside his personal best. Under the 1984 tables (taking effect in 1985) Thompson's 8797 scored 8846, whereas Hingsen's 8798 was only 8832. Nevertheless, Hingsen retained the record under the IAAF's grandfather rule.

In 1986, the IAAF re-examined the photo finish of Thompson's Olympic 110mH, found it was one-thousandth of a second faster than initially thought, and rounded his time down from 14.34 to 14.33. This gave him one extra point, thereby retrospectively equalling Hingsen's 8798 under the 1962 tables, and scoring 8847 on the 1984 tables. The IAAF ruled on 15 July 1986 that Thompson was co-holder of the world record from 9 August 1984 until 1 April 1985, and sole holder thereafter.

Results

See also
 1982 Men's European Championships Decathlon
 1983 Men's World Championship Decathlon
 1984 Men's Friendship Games Decathlon (Moscow)
 1986 Men's European Championships Decathlon

Footnotes

References

External links
  Official Report
  Results
  olympic.neostrada

Decathlon
1984
Men's events at the 1984 Summer Olympics